The Osaka Resort City 200 is a building complex in the Minato-ku ward of Osaka, Japan. Completed in March 1993, it consists of four blocks, including the Osaka Bay Tower, the height of which in meters is referenced in the complex's name.

Overview
All of them are connected to each other by a pedway and surround an atrium located in the center. Several floors of both buildings are meant for offices. The remaining two blocks include a radio station, a musical hall, a sports club, restaurants and shops. The leisure facilities feature one of Japan's largest indoor swimming pools. The total floor area of the ORC 200 complex equals .

Developed by the Shimizu Corporation in accordance with the design by Yasui Architects & Engineers, Inc., it was a part of a Land Trust Program in Osaka. The construction of the complex costed 83 billion yen.

The Osaka Resort City 200 was a subject of a series of lawsuits. In March 2001, the Osaka District Court ordered the city of Osaka to pay 63.7 billion yen to the banks which the complex was entrusted to, and which suffered financial losses due to the economic bubble burst and subsequent rent reductions, including Resona Bank, Sumitomo Mitsui Trust Bank, and The Bank of Tokyo-Mitsubishi UFJ. The city appealed to the court and no consensus was reached until March 2013, when it agreed to pay the banks a compensation of 64.5 billion yen.

See also 
 List of tallest structures in Osaka Prefecture

References

Office buildings completed in 1993
Skyscrapers in Osaka
Skyscraper office buildings in Japan
Skyscraper hotels in Japan
Residential skyscrapers in Japan
Retail buildings in Japan
1993 establishments in Japan